Mario Ceroli (born 1938) is an Italian sculptor. His work has been exhibited at the Museum of Modern Art in New York City and the Mississippi Museum of Art in Jackson, Mississippi. One of his sculptures is on the Luigi Einaudi campus of the University of Turin, and another one is at the Vatican Museums.

References

Living people
1938 births
People from the Province of Chieti
20th-century Italian sculptors
20th-century Italian male artists
21st-century Italian sculptors
21st-century Italian male artists